The Farmleigh Bridge, also known as the Silver Bridge, Guinness Bridge or Strawberry Beds Bridge, is a disused bridge spanning the River Liffey and the Lower Lucan Road in the Strawberry Beds, Dublin, Ireland.

Farmleigh Bridge is a single-span cast iron box truss bridge.

In an 1836 Ordnance Survey map of the Strawberry Beds area, two ferries are depicted as operating on the Liffey. One was situated at the bottom of Knockmaroon Hill and the other was a half-mile upstream where the current Farmleigh Bridge now stands. It is suspected that the ferry at this site was a private operation for the Guinness family as they owned land on the south bank of the river. It is understood the iron bridge eventually replaced the ferry and was probably built by the engineering department of the Guinness Brewery. It was built in the 1870s to carry water pipes and electricity lines from the mill race turbine to the nearby Farmleigh House and the clock tower (which housed a large water tank), by Edward Cecil Guinness who had bought the estate in 1872. There were ornate gates at either end of the bridge and a tunnel entrance where it ended abruptly in the side of a hill. The pipes and cables were covered by a deck for pedestrian use. Privately built by the Guinness family, it was also used by staff who lived on the south side of the river (by Palmerstown) as a short-cut to the grand house.

The bridge (near the Angler's Rest pub) is long disused, with no remaining base or platform to carry traffic. Though the elaborate stone gateway remains, the tunnel is no longer accessible and has been collapsed.

As of late 2015, campaigners had initiated a petition for the bridge to be restored and used as part of a Liffey greenway plan. However, as of mid-2016, no funding had been allocated by Fingal County Council to renovation of the bridge.

In 2021 it was featured in the RTÉ One television series .

Sources

References 

Buildings and structures in Fingal
Bridges in County Dublin